Zoltán Hercegfalvi (born 31 December 1979 in Budapest) is a Hungarian footballer.

Career

Club
Hercegfalvi joined the youth academy of storied Hungarian team Honvéd at the age of 6, and played all the way through their system before making his first team appearance in 1998. He played at Honvéd until 2003, and subsequently enjoyed stints with rivals Videoton Székesfehérvár, Lombard-Pápa TFC, and Czech side Slavia Prague, before rejoining Honvéd in 2006. In total, Hercegfalvi spent more than 20 years at Honvéd, and made over 150 appearances for the club.

He won the Hungarian Cup with Honvéd in 2007 and played in the UEFA Intertoto Cup with Székesfehérvár in 2003, with Lombard-Pápa in 2005, and with Honvéd in 2008.

Hercegfalvi joined the Kansas City Wizards on 28 July 2009. Hercegfalvi missed most of the 2010 season due to a torn ACL suffered in a 2–1 friendly win over AC St. Louis and was released at the conclusion of the 2010 season.

International
Hercegfalvi has also appeared three times for the Hungarian national football team.

References

External links
 
 Budapest Honved bio
 
 Zoltán Hercegfalvi fansite

1979 births
Living people
Footballers from Budapest
Hungarian footballers
Association football forwards
Hungary international footballers
Nemzeti Bajnokság I players
Budapest Honvéd FC players
Fehérvár FC players
Lombard-Pápa TFC footballers
Czech First League players
SK Slavia Prague players
Sporting Kansas City players
Budapest Honvéd FC II players
Vasas SC players
Hungarian expatriate footballers
Expatriate footballers in the Czech Republic
Expatriate soccer players in the United States
Hungarian expatriate sportspeople in the Czech Republic
Hungarian expatriate sportspeople in the United States
Major League Soccer players